Sandhem is a locality situated in Mullsjö Municipality, Jönköping County, Sweden with 702 inhabitants in 2010.

Notable residents

References 

Populated places in Mullsjö Municipality